Pateros   is a city in Okanogan County, Washington, United States. The population was 643 at the 2000 census and increased 3.7% to 667 in the 2010 census.

History

Pateros was originally established as Ive's Landing in around 1886 by Lee Ives. Ives began farming the area near the confluence of the Methow and Columbia Rivers, which was populated by a small band of Native Americans and around 20 Chinese miners. Ives also built an 18-room hotel at the town site and operated a ferry crossing. The first post office was built in 1895.

In 1900, Charles Nosler acquired most of the townsite. He renamed the town to Pateros, after a town in the Philippines he previously visited. In 1903, the city consisted of four commercial establishments and nine residences and the town was sold to J.C. Steiner. Steiner vigorously promoted the town, making Pateros the principal rail shipping point between Oroville and Wenatchee. Pateros was officially incorporated on May 1, 1913.

In 1962, the Federal Power Commission granted the Douglas County Public Utility District a 50-year license to build and operate Wells Dam about 8 miles downstream of Pateros. Construction of the dam would flood much of the original city. Wells Dam went into operation in 1967. Despite relocation of the city, the population dropped by almost a third from 1960 to 1970.

Much of Pateros was destroyed by the Carlton Complex wildfire on July 17 and 18, 2014. No injuries or fatalities were reported, but at least 95 homes in the area were reported destroyed, along with at least one business.

Geography
Pateros is located at  (48.053457, -119.902544).

Climate
This climatic region is typified by large seasonal temperature differences, with warm to hot (and often humid) summers and cold (sometimes severely cold) winters.  According to the Köppen Climate Classification system, Pateros has a humid continental climate, abbreviated "Dfb" on climate maps.

Demographics

2010 census
As of the census of 2010, there were 667 people, 238 households, and 162 families residing in the city. The racial makeup of the city was 76.9% White, 0.1% African American, 3.1% Native American, 17.2% from other races, and 2.5% from two or more races. Hispanic or Latino of any race were 37.8% of the population.

There were 238 households, of which 39.1% had children under the age of 18 living with them, 52.1% were married couples living together, 10.5% had a female householder with no husband present, 5.5% had a male householder with no wife present, and 31.9% were non-families. 26.5% of all households were made up of individuals, and 12.2% had someone living alone who was 65 years of age or older. The average household size was 2.76 and the average family size was 3.27.

The median age in the city was 33.9 years. 30.6% of residents were under the age of 18; 8.8% were between the ages of 18 and 24; 24.6% were from 25 to 44; 24.2% were from 45 to 64; and 11.4% were 65 years of age or older. The gender makeup of the city was 51.9% male and 48.1% female.

2000 census
As of the census of 2000, there were 643 people, 249 households, and 172 families residing in the city. The population density was 1,256.5 people per square mile (486.8/km2). There were 279 housing units at an average density of 545.2 per square mile (211.2/km2). The racial makeup of the city was 77.76% White, 1.40% Native American, 0.31% Asian, 19.28% from other races, and 1.24% from two or more races. Hispanic or Latino of any race were 29.86% of the population.

There were 249 households, out of which 36.1% had children under the age of 18 living with them, 56.2% were married couples living together, 10.0% had a female householder with no husband present, and 30.9% were non-families. 29.7% of all households were made up of individuals, and 14.1% had someone living alone who was 65 years of age or older. The average household size was 2.58 and the average family size was 3.22.

In the city, the population was spread out, with 27.5% under the age of 18, 9.5% from 18 to 24, 27.4% from 25 to 44, 19.0% from 45 to 64, and 16.6% who were 65 years of age or older. The median age was 35 years. For every 100 females, there were 94.3 males. For every 100 females age 18 and over, there were 91.8 males.

The median income for a household in the city was $30,938, and the median income for a family was $39,375. Males had a median income of $30,521 versus $20,208 for females. The per capita income for the city was $13,646. About 9.3% of families and 17.1% of the population were below the poverty line, including 19.7% of those under age 18 and 8.8% of those age 65 or over.

Events

Pateros Hydro Classic
In mid-August Tacoma Inboard Racing Association hosts the "Pateros Hydro Classic." Each year racers come from all over the country to race on Lake Pateros. Hydroplanes fly at speeds up to one hundred and forty miles per hour. They are powered by eight cylinders and are so loud the whole town can hear them. A mile and a quarter liquid oval course is tight for fifty hydroplanes fighting for the gold. The race starts at ten thirty in the morning. Fans watch from the grassy park on the side of the lake which is really the Columbia River. A fireworks display is the finale of a long day of races on the Lake.

Notable people
Richard Beyer, sculptor
Ron Terpening, author

Sister cities
International sister cities:
International
  Pateros, Metro Manila, Philippines

References

External links
 Pateros Chamber of Commerce
 History of Okanogan County

Cities in Washington (state)
Cities in Okanogan County, Washington
Washington (state) populated places on the Columbia River
Populated places in the Okanagan Country